Melissa "Missy" Peregrym (born June 16, 1982) is a Canadian actress and former fashion model. She is known for her roles as Haley Graham in the 2006 film Stick It and Officer Andy McNally on the ABC and Global Television Network series Rookie Blue (2010–2015), for which she was nominated for a Canadian Screen Award in 2016.

Since 2018, Peregrym has starred in FBI, a series on CBS.

Early life
Peregrym was born in Montreal to Rev. Darrell Peregrym, a Pentecostal minister and Vanessa Peregrym, a housewife. She describes herself as having been a tomboy while growing up.

Career
At age 18, Peregrym began her professional career with the Lizbell Agency. It was during her early modelling career that she was encouraged by her agency to move over to commercials. Due to this shift from print to screen, she did commercials for Mercedes-Benz, Sprint Canada, and the Olympic Games.

In 2000, Peregrym made her acting debut in an episode of Dark Angel, shot in Vancouver, British Columbia. Building upon her debut role, she performed in guest star roles on The Chris Isaak Show, Black Sash, Jake 2.0, Smallville, Tru Calling, Life as We Know It, Andromeda, Heroes, and in the television film Call Me: The Rise and Fall of Heidi Fleiss.

After an uncredited cameo in 2004's superhero film Catwoman, Peregrym made her film debut in 2006, playing the lead role in Stick It, a film revolving around a rebellious teenager who is forced to return to her former life in gymnastics.

Peregrym then played the role of an illusion-generating Candice Wilmer on the television series Heroes, who was billed by production staff in promotional materials as "a female temptress". She was due to appear in the episode titled "Parasite", but she made her debut appearance in a non-speaking role in episode "Company Man" the week before.

Peregrym had her first lead television role on The CW series Reaper from 2007 to 2009. Nikki Reed initially played the role in the unaired pilot. Reaper was about a young man named Sam who became a bounty hunter for the devil.

Peregrym's big breakthrough came in 2010 when she landed a lead role in the Canadian television series Rookie Blue in the role of police officer Andy McNally. The series aired in North America, simultaneously on the Global Television Network in Canada and on ABC in the United States. The show ran for six seasons, and was canceled in 2015.

In 2012, Peregrym was cast in the leading role of Chloe Jocelyn in Yahoo.com's web-based series Cybergeddon. Nine chapters were filmed and are available for viewing as of September 27, 2012. The project was supported and funded in part by Norton. In 2013, she won a Streamy Award for her role in the web series Cybergeddon.

In 2014, Peregrym co-starred with Jeff Roop and Eric Balfour in the survival bear attack film Backcountry.

In 2016, Peregrym was nominated for a Canadian Screen Award for her role in Rookie Blue, but ultimately lost to Orphan Black's Tatiana Maslany.

In 2018, Peregrym began her current role starring in a lead role as Agent Maggie Bell in FBI, a series on CBS.

Personal life
Peregrym married American actor Zachary Levi in June 2014. Peregrym filed for divorce in April 2015, listing the date of separation as December 3, 2014.

Peregrym married Australian actor Tom Oakley in Los Angeles on December 30, 2018. She and Oakley have a son, Otis Paradis Oakley, born on March 21, 2020. They also have a daughter, Mela Joséphine Oakley, born on June 6, 2022, announced publicly on July 8, 2022 in an Instagram post.

Charity work
In 2006, Peregrym joined forces with TOMS, a shoe company which also donates safe footwear for communities in South America. Peregrym has spoken about her experiences in Argentina and of its impact on the communities she visited.

Filmography

Film

Television

References

External links

 
 

1982 births
Living people
21st-century Canadian actresses
Actresses from Montreal
Anglophone Quebec people
Canadian expatriate actresses in the United States
Canadian film actresses
Canadian television actresses
Female models from Quebec
Models from Montreal
Streamy Award winners